Thomas Casady (June 6, 1881 – September 9, 1958) was the third missionary bishop of Oklahoma and the first diocesan bishop of the Diocese of Oklahoma in the Episcopal Church.

Early life and education
Casady was born in Des Moines, Iowa, the son of banker Simon Casady and Sarah Conarroe Casady (Griffiths) and grandson of Iowa state senator Phineas M. Casady. He graduated from the University of Iowa with a Bachelor of Arts in 1902. In 1903 he entered General Theological Seminary and graduated in 1906. After he became bishop he received an honorary doctorate of sacred theology from General Seminary and an honorary doctorate of divinity from The University of the South, Sewanee, Tennessee.

Career and family
He was ordained deacon on June 27, 1906 by Bishop Arthur Llewellyn Williams of Nebraska and priest on February 10, 1907 by Bishop M. Edward Fawcett of Quincy. He was initially a deacon at St Mary's Church in Oelwein, Iowa, and then became rector of St Mark's Church in Des Moines, Iowa. He also served as rector of Ascension Church in Pueblo, Colorado between 1912 and 1920 and then as rector of All Saints' Church in Omaha, Nebraska from 1920 to 1927. 

On June 27, 1906, he married Frances LeBaron Kasson, a descendant of the colonial Massachusetts Governor William Bradford. They had six children: Simon Casady, Frances Cristabel Sherman, Reverend P. M. Casady, Reverend Mac Casady, Richard R. Casady, and Thomas Casady Jr.

Episcopacy
Casady was elected by the house of bishops to be the third Missionary Bishop of Oklahoma in June 1927. He was consecrated bishop on October 2, 1927, at All Saints' Church, Omaha, Nebraska by Presiding Bishop John Gardner Murray. When the Diocese of Oklahoma was formed in 1938, Casady became its first diocesan bishop. The Casady School was founded by Bishop Casady and the Episcopal Diocese of Oklahoma in 1947. In 1953, the W. R. Chilton Powell succeeded Casady as bishop of the diocese.

Consecrators 
 John Gardner Murray, 16th presiding bishop of the Episcopal Church
 Theodore Nevin Morrison, 3rd bishop of Iowa
 George Allan Beecher, 2nd bishop of Kearney (The Platte)
Thomas Casady was the 355th bishop consecrated for the Episcopal Church.

See also
 Succession of Bishops of the Episcopal Church in the United States
 Episcopal Diocese of Oklahoma

References

External links
 Website of the Diocese of Oklahoma
 Casady School

1881 births
1958 deaths
American people of Scotch-Irish descent
Burials at Woodland Cemetery (Des Moines, Iowa)
Casady family
Religious leaders from Oklahoma
American Anglican missionaries
Anglican missionaries in the United States
20th-century Anglican bishops in the United States
Clergy from Des Moines, Iowa
Episcopal bishops of Oklahoma